Alexander Springs may refer to:

Alexander Springs Wilderness, a protected area in Florida
Alexander Springs, Tennessee, an unincorporated community